Scrobipalpa griseoflava is a moth in the family Gelechiidae. It was described by Oleksiy V. Bidzilya and Yury I. Budashkin in 2011. It is found on the Crimea.  Adults are on wing from mid-May to mid-June.

The larvae probably feed on Halimione verrucifera.

References

Scrobipalpa
Moths described in 2011